The Temple Beth-El, located in downtown Pensacola, Florida, is the oldest dedicated Jewish house of worship in Florida. The temple was founded in 1876.

Beth-El is a member of the Union for Reform Judaism, and has led the congregation in Reform Judaism services since the temple's foundation. The current rabbi is Joel Fleekop.

History

The first Jews who migrated to northwest Florida originally stopped at Milton, twenty miles to the east, because Milton was a national hub for lumber production and distribution in the South (the first Jews to the area were skilled in lumber production; they came from heavily wooded areas in what is now southern Germany). 

Sensing more business opportunities to the west, a congregation settled in Pensacola and founded a Reform temple after forming in 1876. Many of the lumber workers in Milton did not follow the congregation, and eventually started a smaller Jewish community in Okaloosa County when lumber opportunities dried up. The male members of Beth-El's first congregation consisted largely of businessmen and tavern owners.

The first two buildings of Temple Beth-El were destroyed in fires, first in 1895 and again in 1929.       

Temple Beth-El is now in its third building, still in its same spot on 800 North Palafox Street. The current building, designed in the 1930s, is an example of Art Deco architecture, which was prominent in Florida at the time.

Today, many members of the current congregation are descendants of the men who founded the temple over 125 years ago. Immigrants from Eastern Europe, Israel, and the Caucasus eventually settled in Pensacola and became part of the congregation as well. Beth-El is unique today in that a large number of the congregation consists of Jews who converted from other faiths.

Starting in 1962, Paula Ackerman, the first woman to perform rabbinical functions in the United States, served the congregation at Beth-El. A Pensacola native, Beth-El was Mrs. Ackerman's home temple and she was asked to fill in until a suitable replacement was found in 1963.

Well-known members

Paula Ackerman (1893 – 1989), both as a child and later serving the congregation as a rabbi.
C. J. Heinberg (1901 – 1990) physician, first mayor of Gulf Breeze

External links

Temple Beth-El website
Jews in Florida timeline (mentions Beth-El)

Sources
A History of Temple Beth-el, Pensacola, Florida 1876-1990, By Janel D. Hendrix, Published by Trent's Prints, 2004

See also

Oldest synagogues in the United States

References

Art Deco architecture in Florida
Art Deco synagogues
Buildings and structures in Pensacola, Florida
German-American culture in Florida
German-Jewish culture in the United States
Reform synagogues in Florida
Religious organizations established in 1876
1876 establishments in Florida